Polyrhaphidini is a tribe of longhorn beetles of the subfamily Lamiinae.

Taxonomy
 Eudryoctenes
 Polyrhaphis

References

Polyrhaphidini
Lamiinae